"This Wreckage" is a song written and performed by Gary Numan. It was featured as the opening track on his 1980 LP Telekon and was the third and final single to be released from that album (although the only one to feature on every configuration of Telekon worldwide).

Described by Numan as a "self-portrait" song, "This Wreckage" foreshadowed his temporary retirement from touring with lyrics that evoke images of reclusion and hiding ("Turn out these eyes / Wipe off my face / Erase me"). It also contains echoes of atheism ("And what if God's dead / We must have done something wrong / This dark facade ends / We're independent from someone"), a belief that Numan would later explore and espouse vocally.

Musically, the song has been described as an illogical choice of a single because of its slow tempo and choppy drumbeat mixed underneath the heavy rhythm guitar. Numan originally intended to release "Remind Me to Smile," which is uptempo. Compared with many of Numan's other early hits, This Wreckage stalled on the UK Singles Charts, peaking at #20 in December 1980. The single's B-side was the moody piano-based instrumental "Photograph."

Gary Numan songs
1980 songs
Songs written by Gary Numan
Beggars Banquet Records singles